Lenzitopsis is a genus of fungi in the family Thelephoraceae. This genus contains two species,
the type Lenzitopsis oxycedri and L. daii, described as new to science in 2012.

The genus name of Lenzitopsis is in honour of Harald Othmar Lenz (1798–1870), who was a German naturalist from Thüringen.

References

External links

Thelephorales
Thelephorales genera